Nordenskiöldkysten is a coastal region at Spitsbergen, Svalbard, Norway. It forms the western coast of Nordenskiöld Land between the points Steinneset and Lewinodden, with a coastline of about sixty kilometers. Nordenskiöldkysten is included in the Nordenskiöld Land National Park. The coastal region, including the nearby mountain Ingeborgfjellet, was decided a Ramsar site in 2011.

References

Landforms of Spitsbergen
Ramsar sites in Norway